2008 in cycle racing may refer to:

 2008 in men's road cycling
 2008 in women's road cycling
 2008–09 in men's cyclo-cross
 2008 in track cycling

See also
 2008 in sports